David Stewart (director) may refer to:
 David Stewart (photographer), born 1958
 David J. Stewart, 1915–1966